David Lee Norvell (born August 1, 1935) is an American lawyer and politician who served as attorney general of New Mexico from 1971 to 1975.

Early life and education 
Norvell was born in Kansas City, Missouri and was raised in Bartlesville, Oklahoma. In 1955, he received a Bachelor of Science degree from Northeastern State University in Tahlequah, Oklahoma and a Juris Doctor from the University of Oklahoma College of Law 1958.

Career 
Norvell served in the New Mexico House of Representatives from 1962 to 1970. In the House, he served as both majority floor leader (1967) and speaker of the House (1969). Norvell has practiced law in both Clovis, New Mexico and in Albuquerque since 1976.

Most recently, Norvell has served on the New Mexico Racing Commission and New Mexico Gaming Control Board.

References

1935 births
Living people
Politicians from Kansas City, Missouri
New Mexico Attorneys General
Speakers of the New Mexico House of Representatives
Democratic Party members of the New Mexico House of Representatives
University of Oklahoma alumni
Northeastern State University alumni
Lawyers from Kansas City, Missouri